The Butler Range is a range located in the Ashburton District of Canterbury on the South Island of New Zealand. To the south of the range is the Rakaia River. The area was first farmed by Samuel Butler, who called his holding Mesopotamia Station. Mount Butler is located further south in the Butler Range and is also named after Samuel Butler.

References

External links
 Map of the Butler Range

Mountain ranges of Canterbury, New Zealand
Mountain ranges of the Southern Alps